Taqiabad (also Romanized as Taqīābād) is a village in Karvan-e Olya Rural District, Karvan District, Tiran and Karvan County, Isfahan Province, Iran. At the 2006 census, its population was 224, in 66 families.

References 

Populated places in Tiran and Karvan County